The 2012 African Handball Cup Winners' Cup was the 28th edition, organized by the African Handball Confederation, under the auspices of the International Handball Federation, the handball sport governing body. The tournament was held from April 19–30, 2012 at the Salle El-Menzah in Tunis, Tunisia, contested by 13 teams and won by Étoile Sportive du Sahel of Tunisia.

Draw

Preliminary rounds
Times given below are in CET UTC+1.

Group A

* Note:  Advance to quarter-finals Relegated to 9-12th classification

Group B

* Note:  Advance to quarter-finals Relegated to 9-12th classification** Penalty for failing to pay participation fees

Group C

* Note:  Advance to quarter-finals Relegated to 9-12th classification

Knockout stage
Championship bracket

5-8th bracket

9-12th bracket

Final standings

Awards

References

External links
 Tournament profile at goalzz.com
 General calendar - cahbonline
 Results - cahbonline

African Handball Cup Winners' Cup
Cup Winners' Cup